Larry Charles' Dangerous World of Comedy is an American documentary television series that premiered on Netflix on February 15, 2019. The 4-part series follows the comedy writer and director Larry Charles, of ‘Borat’ and ‘The Dictator’ fame, as he "travels the world in search of humor in the most unusual, unexpected and dangerous places," such as Iraq, Somalia, Liberia, and Nigeria. He interviews comedians including Ahmad Al-Basheer, Trevor Noah, Brace "PissPigGranddad" Belden, and Hatoon Kadi. He also spends time exploring the American alt-right and its relationship to comedy, interviewing internet figures Anthime "Baked Alaska" Gionet and Andrew "Weev" Auernheimer.

Episodes

References

External links
 Netflix title
 IMDB page

English-language Netflix original programming
2019 American television series debuts
2010s American documentary television series